Klairung Treejaksung (Thai: ใกล้รุ่ง ตรีจักรสังข์) is a  Thai football coach and former Thailand national football team player He is currently assistant head coach Thai League 1 club of Port.

References

1973 births
Living people
Klairung Treejaksung
Klairung Treejaksung
Klairung Treejaksung
Klairung Treejaksung
Klairung Treejaksung
Klairung Treejaksung
Association football forwards
Footballers at the 1998 Asian Games
Klairung Treejaksung